Musa Cherutich Sirma is a Kenyan politician. He is the former minister for East African and Regional Cooperation in Kenya and a former member of parliament for the Eldama Ravine Constituency.

Political career 
He was returned as MP at the 2022 general election.

References

Year of birth missing (living people)
Living people
Members of the National Assembly (Kenya)
Government ministers of Kenya
Members of the 8th Parliament of Kenya
Members of the 9th Parliament of Kenya
Members of the 13th Parliament of Kenya
21st-century Kenyan politicians